The Southeast Peninsula of Saint Kitts island is located in Saint Kitts and Nevis, in the Lesser Antilles archipelago of the Caribbean.

Geography
It stretches southeast from the country's capital, Basseterre, for ~14 kilometres to the waters of The Narrows, the strait which separates Saint Kitts island nearby Nevis island. It is connected to the rest of the island by an isthmus which, at its narrowest, is less than one kilometre wide.

Features
Features of the peninsula include the Great Salt Pond, the country's largest lake, St. Anthony's Peak, Turtle Beach, and several bays (including Ballast Bay, Major's Bay, and Cockleshell Bay).

Until recently, this scrubby, low-lying peninsula, was less extensively developed than the rest of the island, being accessible mainly by boat. The construction of an all-weather road during the 1990s has led to some development, particularly around Turtle Beach.

Saint Kitts (island)
Landforms of Saint Kitts and Nevis
Peninsulas of North America